In the fifth consecutive final appearance, Marjorie Crawford and Jack Crawford successfully defended their title for a third consecutive year by defeating Midge Van Ryn and Ellsworth Vines 3–6, 7–5, 13–11, to win the mixed doubles tennis title at the 1933 Australian Championships.

Seeds

  Marjorie Crawford /  Jack Crawford (champions)
  Midge Van Ryn /  Ellsworth Vines (final)
  Nell Hall /  Harry Hopman (semifinals)
  Joan Hartigan /  Gar Moon (quarterfinals)
  Dorothy Weston /  Don Turnbull (quarterfinals)
 ( Kath Woodward /  Harry Hassett) (quarterfinals)

Draw

Finals

Earlier rounds

Section 1

Section 2

Notes

References

External links
   Sources for seedings

1933 in Australian tennis
Mixed Doubles